Join the Parade is the fourth studio album by American singer-songwriter Marc Cohn, released in 2007.

An MP3 version of the album was released on iTunes on September 25, 2007 and contained the bonus track "You're a Shadow", which is not on the studio release.

The first track off the album, "Listening to Levon", was released as a promotional single, and received some airplay on WYEP-FM.

A making of "Join the Parade" video was released by Decca Records on Amazon Music, and features Cohn talking about the process of producing the album. He also discusses topics that influenced many of the songs, Hurricane Katrina, and the near-death experience of being shot in the head in a failed carjacking attempt while on tour.

Track listing
All tracks written by Marc Cohn, except where noted.

Personnel 
 Marc Cohn – lead vocals, acoustic piano (1, 5, 6, 8, 9, 10), acoustic guitar (2, 3), keyboards (4), drum machine (4), tack piano (9)
 Benmont Tench – organ (1, 5, 6), keyboards (2), Hammond organ (2), Wurlitzer electric piano (5, 6)
 Patrick Warren – pump organ (2, 9), Chamberlin (2, 9), keyboards (3, 4, 7, 9)
 Kenny White – Wurlitzer electric piano (4)
 David Barrett – Mellotron (4)
 Malcolm Burn – keyboards (8), guitar (8), percussion (8)
 Charlie Sexton – acoustic guitar (1, 3, 5, 10), 12-string acoustic guitar (1), electric guitar (1, 2, 3), steel guitar (1), drums (1, 3), harmony vocals (1, 5), acoustic piano (2), loops (2), backing vocals (2, 6, 8), 6-string bass guitar (3), percussion (3, 5, 8, 9), keyboards (5), baritone guitar (5), bass guitar (5, 6, 8), cello (5, 7), violin (5), guitar (6, 7, 8), 12-string guitar (6), slide guitar (6, 10), Leslie guitar (7), live guitar loops (7), bouzouki (7, 9), Wurlitzer electric piano (8), pump organ bass (9), resonator guitar (9), electric upright bass (9)
 Danny Kortchmar – guitar (4)
 Bill Dillon – guitar (8)
 Shane Fontayne – Fender 6-string bass guitar (1, 6), guitar (2, 4), tremolo guitar (3), acoustic guitar (5), National guitar (7), baritone guitar (9)
 Jennifer Condos – bass guitar (1, 2, 4, 5, 6)
 Sebastian Steinberg – acoustic bass (3), electric upright bass (7)
 Greg Cohen – acoustic bass (10)
 Jay Bellerose – drums (2, 3, 5, 7, 9)
 Jim Keltner – drums (2-5, 7, 9)
 Jerome Smith – trombone (3, 9)
 Ephraim Owens – trumpet solo (2), trumpet (3), flugelhorn (9)
 Tosca String Quartet – strings (10)
 Stephen Barber – string arrangements (10)
 Paulette McWilliams – backing vocals (2, 5)
 Cindy Mizelle – backing vocals (1)
 Charley Drayton – backing vocals (2, 8), drums (6, 8, 10)
 Amy Helm – backing vocals (3)
 Rose Stone – backing vocals (3)
 The Holmes Brothers – backing vocals (4, 9)
 Sharon Bryant – backing vocals (5)
 Shelby Lynne – backing vocals (5), harmony vocals (7)
 N'Dea Davenport – backing vocals (8)

Production 
 Marc Cohn – producer 
 Malcolm Burn – producer 
 Charlie Sexton – producer 
 Brad Bell – engineer, editing 
 Joe Blaney – engineer, mixing 
 Niko Bolas – engineer 
 Kyle Crushman – engineer, editing
 T.J. Doherty – engineer 
 Kevin Halpin – engineer 
 Philip Hill – engineer, editing
 Jim Scott – engineer, mixing 
 Jared Tuten – engineer, editing
 Matthew Gill – assistant engineer
 Slick Johnson – assistant engineer 
 Steve Rhodes – assistant engineer, editing 
 Jean Marie Kearney – mix assistant 
 Joe Gastwirt – mastering 
 Tom Arndt – package coordinator 
 Pat Barry – art direction 
 Richard Frankel – art direction, package design 
 Leonard Freed – cover photography
 Myriam Santos-Kayda – photography

References

Marc Cohn albums
2007 albums
Decca Records albums